Thomas L. Callaway is an American film director and cinematographer from Waco, Texas. He resides in Los Angeles.

Filmography
Trafficked (2017)
Punk's Dead (2015)
Rain from Stars (2010)
Something Wicked (2010)
Without a Paddle: Nature's Calling (2009)
The Devil's Tomb (2009)
Still Waiting... (2009)
Exit Speed (2008)
Who's Your Caddy?  (2007)
Eternal Waters (2007) (TV)
Broke Sky (2007) (Director/Cinematographer)
Demon Wind (1990)

References

External links

American cinematographers
Living people
People from Waco, Texas
Year of birth missing (living people)
Film directors from Texas